Francisco de Manzanares y Dardos (born-16th-century) was a Spanish nobleman and politician, who served during the Viceroyalty of Peru, holding honorary functions as alcalde, alguacil, lieutenant governor and regidor of Buenos Aires.

Biography 

He was born in Villa de la Membrilla, La Mancha, the son of Pedro Alonso Dardos and María López de Manzanares, belonging to illustrious Spanish families. He was married in Buenos Aires to Leonor de Aguilar Pérez de Burgos, daughter of Francisco Pérez de Burgos and Juana de Aguilar y Salvatierra, a Creole lady, daughter of Andrés Gil and Leonor de Zamora, natives of Ronda (Spain). 

He was elected vice-mayor of Buenos Aires in 1613, and served for several periods as regidor of the Cabildo of Buenos Aires. He participated in the funeral honors performed to Diego Marín de Negrón, governor of Buenos Aires, who died in the city in 1613, and also toke part in the swearing of Francés de Beaumont y Navarra, as the new governor.

Francisco de Manzanares y Dardos held various government positions, including alguacil mayor, procurator general, fiel ejecutor and mayordomo of Buenos Aires. He also served as interim lieutenant governor of Buenos Aires in 1600.

References

External links 
geneanet.org

16th-century Spanish people
People from Buenos Aires
Mayors of Buenos Aires
Spanish people of Italian descent
Spanish colonial governors and administrators